Desmond Keogh (born 27 February 1935) is an Irish actor. He was born in Birr, County Offaly.  He was trained as a lawyer before entering the theatre in his twenties.

He has toured widely in a one-man show called The Love-Hungry Farmer, an adaptation by Keogh from a work by the Irish playwright John B. Keane. He has also appeared in a one-man show of Confessions of an Irish Publican by the same playwright.

Keogh has worked with major Irish theatre companies, and also in the London theatre.  His film credits include Ryan's Daughter, Ulysses, and Flight of the Doves.

For approximately 35 years, Keogh hosted a weekly radio program for RTÉ's Light Programme  called Music for Middlebrows. It was also the name of book on the subject he wrote in 1998.

In April 2010, Keogh appeared in the title role in the play Da by Hugh Leonard at the Olney Theatre Center for the Arts in Olney, Maryland, USA.

During early 2016 he starred with Derry Power in The Quiet Land by Bairbre Ni Chaoimh at Bewley's Theatre Café, Dublin.

From 2016, Keogh appeared as Reg Barker on the CBBC series, Little Roy.

Filmography

References

External links
 

1935 births
Living people
Irish male film actors
Irish male stage actors
Irish writers about music
People from Birr, County Offaly
RTÉ Radio 1 presenters